Alexander Scriabin's  Symphony No. 2, Op. 29, in C minor was written in 1901 and first performed in St Petersburg under Anatol Lyadov on 12 January 1902.

Structure 
The second symphony is the most structurally conventional of all Scriabin's symphonies. However, it features extensive thematic transformation establishing a cyclic link between its movements. The sombre initial theme of the first movement is developed to a triumphant hymn functioning as the main subject of the finale.

The symphony consists of five movements, although the first two and the final two are connected to each other without a break:

Reception 
When Vassily Safonoff, conductor of the New York Philharmonic from 1903 to 1919, conducted Scriabin's Second Symphony for the first time, he waved the score at the orchestra and said, "Here is the new Bible, gentlemen..."

References

External links 
 

Symphonies by Alexander Scriabin
1901 compositions
Compositions in C minor